The naval Battle of Zonchio (also known as the Battle of Sapienza or the First Battle of Lepanto) took place on four separate days: 12, 20, 22, and 25 August 1499. It was a part of the Ottoman–Venetian War of 1499–1503.

Preparations
In January 1499 Kemal Reis set sail from Constantinople with a force of 10 galleys and 4 other types of ships, and in July met with the huge Ottoman fleet which was sent to him by Davud Pasha and took over its command in order to wage a large scale war against the Republic of Venice. The Ottoman fleet consisted of 290 ships, of which 60 galliots and a handful of carracks. The Venetian fleet of 17 galleys, 46 galliots, and about 15 carracks was under the command of Antonio Grimani. Grimani was 65 and although he was a proven captain in battle, he was not an experienced leader and had never commanded large battle fleets. He had only been given command because of a donation of 16,000 ducats to the state and personally funding the arming of 10 galleys. He was not told whether to fight an offensive or defensive campaign.

Battle
After reaching Cape Zonchio in the Ionian Sea with the large Ottoman fleet in August, Kemal Reis defeated the Venetians. Many captains ignored Grimani's orders to attack the Ottomans and he did not take part in the battle. His indecisiveness and reluctance to attack led to failure during the battle.

On the second day, Grimani ordered the crews to kill any captains who refused to fight. Despite this, and the arrival of four French galleys, he sent just two galleys out of 170 against the Ottomans. Both somehow returned unharmed.

On 25 August the Venetians captured some Ottoman galleys, then discipline broke down and the Ottomans recaptured the vessels while they were being looted; the French reinforcements abandoned the Venetians in disgust and fled to Rhodes.

During the most critical stage of the battle, two Venetian carracks, captained by Andrea Loredan (a member of the influential Loredan family of Venice, and cousin of the future doge Leonardo Loredan) and by Alban d'Armer, boarded one of the command ships of the Ottoman fleet. The commander of the vessel, Burak Reis, was unable to disentangle his ship from the boarders and chose to set her aflame. The sight of the three great ships burning together dealt a severe blow to the Venetian morale.

Aftermath
Antonio Grimani was arrested on 29 September and banished to the island of Cherso. Grimani later became the Doge of Venice in 1521. The Ottoman Sultan Bayezid II gave 10 of the captured Venetian galleys to Kemal Reis, who later stationed his fleet at the island of Cefalonia between October and December 1499.

The Ottomans and Venetians soon confronted each other for a second time at the Second Battle of Lepanto, which is also known as the Battle of Modon, and the Ottomans were again victorious under Kemal Reis.

See also

Ottoman Navy
History of the Republic of Venice
History of the Ottoman Empire

References

External links
Sydney N. Fisher: The Foreign Relation of Turkey, 1481–1512, Chapter VI: War with Venice, 1499–1503
John E. Dotson: Foundations of Venetian Naval Strategy from Pietro II Orseolo to the Battle of Zonchio

1499 in Europe
Zonchio
Zonchio
Zonchio
Battles in the Peloponnese
Conflicts in 1499
1499 in the Ottoman Empire